Sonar Harin is a 1959 Bengali film directed by Mangal Chakravarty. This film written by Rashbehari Lal. This film production company by national picturers and distributed by S.K. Films. The film has been music composed by Hemanta Mukherjee. The film starring Uttam Kumar, Kali Bannerjee  Supriya Choudhury in lead and this is the first film of Supriya Devi as a leading heroine. Others Bhanu Banerjee, Chhabi Biswas and Tarun Kumar played in supporting roles.

Plot
Captain Jayanta chowdhary comes back gravely injured and is taken care of by his fiancé Kuntala who is an air hostess. It takes a long time for Jayanta to recover and come out of the trauma. He is visited by Sunanda, his colleague's widowed wife. He holds himself responsible for husband Partho's death and returns his ring to her. Jayanta leaves for Calcutta abruptly and starts following art ground ? engineer Sandeep Mukherjee. Sandeep is forced to work for a smuggling gang run by Krisan Chand and Abdullah. He does this because he needs money for the treatment of his handicapped brother Beenu in Vienna. He often visits a bar where Ruby, his beloved ? Soon the intelligence department headed by Ranjit Mitra starts tracing Sandeep's source of money. Jayanta helps them in the whole. It is found that Ruby had borrowed the money from Krishan chand through hundito ?give it to Sandeep. The police can't do anything because the transaction is recorded on paper. Jayanta now takes up the name of Arun ray, a ground engineer and befriends sandeer beenu ? Sandeep's brother comes back. Recovered Sandeep invites Jayanta to his house where he discovers that Kuntala, then also in Calcutta, is Sandeep's sister. When Kuntala goes to visit him in his hotel, Jayanta breaks off the engagement. Mean while, Krishan chand tell Sandeep that Arun is a spy and orders him to find out how much he knows about the gang. Sandeep comes home to find a broken Kuntala who tells him about her engagement being cancelled. Learning the name of her fiancé makes everything clear to him. He can't bear the fact that his sister would pay for his crime. He goes to Jayanta and is about to confess everything when he is shot by Abdullah. Following a gun fight, Jayanta shoots Abdullah dead. Sandeep confesses everything to Ranjit mitra who records it before his death .Jayanta begs forgiveness from Shakuntala. The couple is reconciled. Krishan chand has paid him a lot of money and fooled him into planting a bomb in a foreign chartered plane in which Jayanta and others were flying. It was a plot hatched by the opposition party of foreign country. He did this to pay for beenu's treatment.

Cast
 Uttam Kumar
 Kali Bannerjee
 Supriya Choudhury
 Bhanu Banerjee
 Chhabi Biswas
 Tarun Kumar
 Lakshmi Devi
 Mihir Bhattacharya
 Kuntala Chatterjee
 Padmadevi
 Bipin Gupta
 Namita Sinha

Music

References

External links
 
 Sonar Harin at The Times of India

1959 films
Bengali-language Indian films
1950s Bengali-language films
Films scored by Hemant Kumar